GBH  (originally known as Charged GBH) are an English punk rock band which was formed in 1978 by vocalist Colin Abrahall, guitarist Colin "Jock" Blyth, bassist Sean McCarthy (replaced by Ross Lomas after two years) and drummer Andy "Wilf" Williams.

Background 
GBH were early pioneers of British street punk, often nicknamed "UK82", along with Discharge, Broken Bones, The Exploited, and The Varukers. GBH have gone on to influence several punk rock musicians, but their influence has been especially far-reaching in metal, including the early Bathory albums, Hellhammer/Celtic Frost, Exodus and each of the "big four of thrash metal" (Metallica, Megadeth, Slayer and Anthrax). Metallica frontman James Hetfield has repeatedly expressed his enthusiasm for GBH and said such bands were the beginning of thrash to him. Sascha Konietzko of KMFDM has said he listened to second-wave punk bands before starting his own band, mentioning GBH as an example. GBH have also influenced 1990s and 2000s rock bands such as Nirvana, Queens of the Stone Age, Green Day, The Offspring and Rancid.

The band's name was originally Charged GBH, then was shortened to GBH. It is widely understood that the name came from then-bassist Sean McCarthy being charged with grievous bodily harm (GBH), though vocalist Colin Abrahall denied this in 2018, claiming it was just a name like UK Subs; and, when pushed, said the initials stood for "Girls, Booze, and Hash". Though the core line up of Colin, Ross, and Jock has stayed the same throughout their history, the drum stool has been occupied by a number of incumbents following Wilf's departure after the Midnight Madness and Beyond album and Oh No It's GBH Again 12" EP.  1989 saw the arrival of German drummer Kai Reder who played on three albums (No Need to Panic, A Fridge Too Far, and From Here to Reality), as well as the Wot a Bargain 12".  Kai was replaced by American Joe "Fish" Montanero for one album (Church of the Truly Warped); this was the band's last release for the Rough Justice label.  The drum stool was then occupied from around 1994 by former Bomb Disneyland/Bomb Everything drummer Scott Preece, who has remained to this day and played on all releases since.

Throughout their recording history, the band has often included a cover version on many of their albums. "Boston Babies" originally recorded by Slaughter & the Dogs (on City Baby Attacked By Rats), "I Feel Alright" from The Damned and The Stooges (on City Baby's Revenge), "Avenues and Alleyways" by Tony Christie (on No Need to Panic), "Needle in a Haystack" originally by The Velvelettes (appeared on A Fridge Too Far), "Destroy" by The Vibrators (on From Here to Reality), "I Need Energy" by Zero Boys (on Church of the Truly Warped).

History

GBH embarked on several English and mainland US tours during the early 1980s, including several gigs at the 100 Club. 1982 saw the release of GBH's first LP, City Baby Attacked by Rats, which reached No. 17 in the UK Albums Chart, as well as No. 2 in the UK Indie Chart. The band's singles had also reached the UK Indie Chart, leading to an  appearance on the UK TV programme The Tube, where they performed "Give Me Fire" (UK Indie Chart No. 2). Lyrically, the album dealt with criticism of British and European culture, violence, morbidity (especially in reference to the song "Passenger on the Menu", which describes in graphic detail the experiences of the passengers on the Uruguayan Air Force Flight 571), atheism, nihilism and humour. Musically, the album was loud and fast, with few songs exceeding three minutes. The success of the first album was repeated with their second LP, City Babys Revenge, in 1983 and saw more extensive touring in America and Europe and higher profile UK shows, including the Carlisle Punk Festival. With the Carlisle Punk Festival the band co-headlined with fellow UK82 stalwarts The Exploited, and shared the bill with the likes of Toy Dolls, Chelsea, and The Destructors. In 1984, the band dropped the "Charged" from their name and became just GBH (grievous bodily harm).

They and many of their UK82 peers such as The Exploited, Picture Frame Seduction, Discharge, and The Varukers have all enjoyed success among punks in the United States. Although many of their contemporaries have evolved towards other styles over the years, GBH have remained fairly faithful to their original UK82 sound in subsequent releases. However, the band have experimented to some degree with a more speed metal-inflected, inspired and influenced sound particularly those of Motörhead and Tank, notably with their 1992 release Church of the Truly Warped, although they have since returned to a more purist punk sound. They have enjoyed a mixed reception from the music press, with 1993's album, From Here To Reality, being described by the NME as "having no redeeming features whatsoever".

The band is still active and touring and maintain a strong following both in the UK and the rest of Europe, as well as in the United States and Japan. The band released their twelfth studio album, Momentum, on Hellcat Records in 2017.

Band members 
Current
 Colin Abrahall – vocals (1978–present)
 Colin "Jock" Blyth – guitar (1978–present)
 Ross Lomas – bass (1980–present)
 Scott Preece – drums (1994–present)

Former
 Sean McCarthy – bass (1978–1980 died 1980)
 Andrew "Wilf" Williams – drums (1978–1986)
 Kai Reder – drums (1986–1992)
 Joseph "Fish" Montanaro – drums (1992–1994)

Timeline

Discography 
Studio albums

Mini album

Split mini albums

12 inch EPs / singles

7-inch EPs / singles

Live albums

Compilation albums

Demos

Compilation appearances (selected)

DVDs and videos

References

External links 

Live video and interview with GBH

English punk rock groups
Crossover thrash groups
Musical groups from Birmingham, West Midlands
British hardcore punk groups
Street punk groups
Musical groups established in 1978
Hellcat Records artists
1978 establishments in England